Wolnica may refer to the following places:
Wolnica, Lublin Voivodeship (east Poland)
Wolnica, Lubusz Voivodeship (west Poland)
Wolnica, Warmian-Masurian Voivodeship (north Poland)